This is a list of the squads picked for the men's 2010 ICC World Twenty20. This was the third edition of ICC World Twenty20 tournament and was held in the West Indies from 30 April to 16 May 2010.

Afghanistan
Afghanistan announced their 15-man squad for the tournament on 1 April 2010.

Coach: Kabir Khan

Australia
Australia announced their 15-man squad for the tournament on 30 March 2010.

Coach: Tim Nielsen

Bangladesh
Bangladesh announced their 15-man squad for the tournament on 30 March 2010.

Coach: Jamie Siddons

England
England announced their 15-man squad for the tournament on 31 March 2010.

Coach: Andy Flower

India
India announced their 15-man squad for the tournament on 26 March 2010.

Coach: Gary Kirsten

Ireland
Ireland announced their 15-man squad for the tournament on 22 March 2010.

Coach: Phil Simmons

New Zealand
New Zealand announced their 15-man squad for the tournament on 31 March 2010.

Coach: Mark Greatbatch

Pakistan
Pakistan announced their 15-man squad on 12 March 2010, but no captain was announced. On 23 March 2010, the Pakistan Cricket Board appointed Shahid Afridi as the captain. Umar Gul and Yasir Arafat were included in the original squad but were replaced by Mohammad Sami and Abdur Rehman due to injury.

Coach: Waqar Younis

South Africa
South Africa announced their 15-man squad for the tournament on 31 March 2010.

Coach: Corrie van Zyl

Sri Lanka
Sri Lanka announced their 15-man squad for the tournament on 31 March 2010.

Coach: Trevor Bayliss

West Indies
The West Indies announced their 15-man squad for the tournament on 1 April 2010.

Coach: Ottis Gibson

Zimbabwe
Zimbabwe announced their 15-man squad for the tournament on 26 March 2010.

Coach: Alan Butcher

Notes

References
 ICC World Twenty20 2010 from Cricinfo

2010 ICC World Twenty20
Cricket squads
ICC Men's T20 World Cup squads